Make My Video is a series of four video games by Digital Pictures in 1992 for the Sega CD. These included series by INXS, by Kris Kross, C+C Music Factory and by Marky Mark and the Funky Bunch. The games featured three songs from the respective musical groups, and the player edited pre-made clips to make a new music video. 

In each game, players are given instructions of what they should include in the video, and then the song is played while the video is edited live. Players can change between video clips available by pressing the buttons on the controller, and choose from clips of videos of the group, stock footage, movie clips, and special effects.

The games were panned and were financial disasters.

Games

INXS

INXS: Make My Video was created as a video game by Digital Pictures in 1992. The game puts the player in control of editing the music videos for the band INXS on the songs "Heaven Sent", "Baby Don't Cry", and "Not Enough Time". All three songs are from the 1992 album Welcome to Wherever You Are, and the box art for the game is taken from the album.

Kris Kross

Kris Kross: Make My Video was created as a video game by Digital Pictures in 1992, due to the popularity of the rap group Kris Kross.

The game puts the player in control of editing the music videos for the group on the songs: "Jump", "I Missed the Bus", and "Warm It Up".

Marky Mark and the Funky Bunch

Marky Mark and the Funky Bunch: Make My Video was created as a video game by Digital Pictures in 1992.

The game puts the player in control of editing the music videos for hip-hop artist Mark Wahlberg and his group Marky Mark and the Funky Bunch on the songs "Good Vibrations", "I Need Money", and "You Gotta Believe".

Reception
All three games turned out to be huge failures, both financially and critically. In 1997 Electronic Gaming Monthly listed the series collectively as number 2 on their "Top 10 Worst Games of All Time". Kris Kross is on Seanbaby's Crapstravaganza list of the 20 worst games of all time at #18.

Game Informer gave Marky Mark 0 out of 10, the lowest score a game ever received from the magazine.  A 2006 PC World article rated the game as number 8 on their list of the 10 worst games of all time.

See also
Power Factory Featuring C+C Music Factory

References

External links
 
 Kris Kross: Make My Video
 INXS: Make My Video
 Make My Video: Marky Mark and the Funky Bunch

1992 video games
Band-centric video games
Full motion video based games
Interactive movie video games
INXS
Music management games
Video games based on musicians
Sega CD games
Sega CD-only games
Video game franchises
Digital Pictures
Video games developed in the United States